The Abrahamites were a sect of deists in Bohemia in the 18th century, who professed to be followers of the pre-circumcised Abraham. Believing in one God, but rejecting the Trinity, original sin, and the perpetuity of punishment for sin, they contented themselves with the Ten Commandments and the Lord's Prayer. Declining to be classed either as Christians or Jews, they were excluded from the edict of toleration promulgated by Emperor Joseph II in 1781, and deported to various parts of the country, the men being drafted into frontier regiments. Some became Roman Catholics, and those who retained their "Abrahamite" views were not able to hand them on to the next generation.

They are not to be confused with the ninth-century Syrian group also known as the Abrahamite monks, who were exterminated by the iconoclastic emperor Theophilus.

See also

 Not to be confused with the descendants of the patriarch Abraham i.e the Northern Arabs and Jews
 Hanifs

References

Abrahamic religions
Deism
Monotheistic religions
Religion in Europe